Gastonia High School is a historic high school building located at Gastonia, Gaston County, North Carolina.  It was designed by Hugh Edward White and built in 1922–1924. It is a five-story, heavily ornamented "E"-shaped Tudor Revival style red brick school.  It has a flat roof with parapet and features a four-bay projecting frontispiece and two-story, elegantly finished, auditorium. It has a six bays long and three bays wide addition built in 1955.

It was listed on the National Register of Historic Places in 1983. It is located in the York-Chester Historic District.

References

School buildings on the National Register of Historic Places in North Carolina
Tudor Revival architecture in North Carolina
School buildings completed in 1924
Buildings and structures in Gaston County, North Carolina
National Register of Historic Places in Gaston County, North Carolina
Historic district contributing properties in North Carolina
1924 establishments in North Carolina